John Frederick Tapp OAM (born 1941 in Ramsgate, New South Wales ) is an Australian former racecaller based in Sydney, Australia.

Career
During a career spanning thirty-three years it is estimated that he has called over 50,000 individual races and became the voice of Australian racing to a whole generation.

As a child John developed a fascination with listening to famous racecaller of the day Ken Howard on the  Wireless Radio, calling races on a Saturday afternoon.

During the time there was no broadcast of mid-week race meetings, so John began painting Paddle Pop sticks the same colours as the jockeys wore on famous horses of the day and learnt his craft by tossing the sticks into the stormwater drain that ran behind his childhood home and then ‘calling’ the ensuing races as the sticks floated off.

Johnny recorded a tribute to the 1977 Golden Slipper winner Luskin Star on M7 records. "The Luskin Star Song" was written by Newcastle musicians Phil Mahoney and Princess Chic Murangi. The A side to the record was a song Johnny wrote called "Paleface Adios", a tribute to the famous pacer.

In his memoirs John nominated Kingston Town, Octagonal and Super Impose amongst the best he had seen during his long career. Although retiring from race calling in 1998 John still maintains an involvement through Sky Channel and his program ‘John Tapp’s Inside Racing’.

Award
He was awarded the Order of Australia Medal in 1996 for service to horse sports as a national and international racecaller, and to charitable organisations as an organiser and compere of fundraising events.

Discography

Singles

References

External links
Sky Channel official website
‘It’s An Honour’ Australian Government official website

1941 births
Living people
Australian racecallers
Australian sports broadcasters
Recipients of the Medal of the Order of Australia
Former 2GB presenters